Mohammed Tawfiq Assiri (born 29 May 1995) is a Saudi Arabian professional footballer who plays as a forward.

Career
Assiri started his career at Al-Faisaly and is a product of the Al-Faisaly's youth system. On 6 April 2017, Assiri made his professional debut for Al-Faisaly against Al-Taawoun in the Pro League. He then played with Najran, Najd, and Arar.

Career statistics

Club

References

External links 
 

1995 births
Living people
Saudi Arabian footballers
Al-Faisaly FC players
Najran SC players
Najd FC players
Arar FC players
Saudi Professional League players
Saudi First Division League players
Saudi Second Division players
Saudi Fourth Division players
Association football forwards